Caladenia ornata, commonly known as ornate pink fingers is a species of orchid endemic to Victoria. It has a single leaf and one or two bright pink flowers with greenish-pink backs, and a dark pink labellum with dark red bars.

Description 
The flowers have a greenish-pink back covered with glandular hairs and are sometimes white in the centre of the front. The sides of the labellum curve upwards and the tip turns downward and has a few short teeth. Flowering occurs from October to December.

Taxonomy and naming 
This orchid was first formally described in 1936 by William Nicholls and given the name Caladenia carnea var. ornata and the description was published in The Victorian Naturalist. In 2000 David Jones raised the variety to species status. The specific epithet (ornata) is a Latin word meaning "decorated", "embellished" or "ornate".

Distribution and habitat 
Ornate pink fingers occurs in isolated populations near Portland, Cherrypool, Lake Fynes and Stawell in south-west Victoria where it grows in heathy forest.

Conservation
Caladenia ornata is classified as "vulnerable" as Caladenia carnea var. ornata under the Victorian Flora and Fauna Guarantee Act 1988 and under the Australian Government Environment Protection and Biodiversity Conservation Act 1999. The main threats to the species are weed invasion, habitat disturbance and trampling and grazing by kangaroos and feral rabbits (Oryctolagus cuniculus).

References 

ornata
Orchids of Victoria (Australia)
Endemic orchids of Australia
Plants described in 1946